Bird Lives! is a live album by multi-instrumentalist Ira Sullivan which was recorded in Chicago in 1962 and released on the Vee-Jay label on LP before being reissued as a double CD with additional material in 1993.

Reception

The AllMusic review by Scott Yanow stated "Ira Sullivan's quintet played at a Charlie Parker Memorial concert in Chicago on Mar. 12, 1962 and the results (six selections) were originally released on a single LP. The release of this double CD greatly expanded the program. ... Overall, a fine bop set".

Track listing
All compositions by Charlie Parker except where noted

Disc One: 

 "Klact-Oveeseds-Tene" – 8:30
 "In Other Words" (Bart Howard) – 6:13 
 "Shaw 'Nuff" ((Ray Brown, Gil Fuller, Dizzy Gillespie) – 2:25
 "Perhaps" – 6:04
 "Love Letters" (Victor Young, Edward Heyman) – 5:08	
 "Mohawk" – 8:31
 "Si Si" – 15:16 Additional track on CD reissue
 "Be-Bop/Humpty Dumpty" (Dizzy Gillespie/Ornette Coleman) – 13:24 Additional track on CD reissue

Disc Two:
 "Milestones" (John Lewis) – 8:14 Additional track on CD reissue
 "Sketches" (Lewis) – 8:14 Additional track on CD reissue
 "Omicron" (Donald Byrd) – 10:33 Additional track on CD reissue
 "On the Alamo" (Isham Jones, Gus Kahn) – 9:58 Additional track on CD reissue
 "Inchworm" (Frank Loesser) – 8:53 Additional track on CD reissue
 "Back Home Blues" – 7:33 Additional track on CD reissue
 "For You, For Me, For Evermore" (George Gershwin, Ira Gershwin) – 5:19 Additional track on CD reissue

Personnel
Ira Sullivan – trumpet, flugelhorn
Nicky Hill – tenor saxophone
Jodie Christian – piano
Don Garrett – bass
Dorell Anderson or Wilbur Campbell – drums

References

Vee-Jay Records live albums
Ira Sullivan live albums
1963 live albums
Charlie Parker tribute albums